Kurnool district is one of the eight districts in the Rayalaseema region of the Indian state of Andhra Pradesh. It is located in the North western part of the state and is bounded by Nandyal district in the east, Anantapur district in the south, Raichur district of Karnataka in the northwest, Bellary district of Karnataka in the west, and Jogulamba Gadwal district in the north. The city of Kurnool is the headquarters of the district. It has a population of 2,271,686 of which 28.35% were urban as of 2011.

History 

Jurreru Valley, Katavani Kunta and Yaganti in the district have some important rock arts and paintings in their vicinity, which are dated back to 35,000 to 40,000 years ago.

Belum Caves are geologically and historically important caves in the district.  There are indications that Jain and Buddhist monks were occupying these caves centuries ago.  Many Buddhists relics were found inside the caves.  These relics are now housed in Museum at Anantapur. Archaeological survey of India (ASI) found remnants of vessels and other artifacts of pre-Buddhist era and has dated the remnants of vessels found in the caves to 4500 BC.

Neelam Sanjeeva Reddy (Anantapur District), the sixth President of India has served as Member of Parliament from Nandyal constituency. He previously served as the Chief Minister of Andhra Pradesh, serving as an MLA from the Dhone assembly constituency. In 1970, part of Kurnool district was split off to become part of Prakasam district. Kurnool District is a part of the Red Corridor.

Geography 
Kurnool is surrounded by districts of  Anantapur district, to south, Nandyal district to east and Bellary of Karnataka to the west and Jogulamba Gadwal district to the north. The district includes the Srisailam Dam and a part of the Nallamala Hills, the rest of it lying in Prakasam district, Nandyal district, Kadapa district, and Nellore district.

Demographics 

According to the 2011 census Kurnool district has a population of 4,053,463, roughly equal to the nation of Liberia or the US state of Oregon. This gives it a ranking of 54th in India (out of a total of 640). Its population growth rate over the decade 2001–2011 was 14.65%. Kurnool has a sex ratio of 984 females for every 1000 males, and a literacy rate of 59.97%.

After bifurcation the district had a population of 22,71,686, of which 764,101 (33.64%) lived in urban areas. Kurnool district has a sex ratio of 990 females per 1000 males. Scheduled Castes and Scheduled Tribes made up 4,15,120 (18.27%) and 30,047 (1.32%) of the population respectively.

At the time of the 2011 census, 79.39% of the population spoke Telugu, 13.62% Urdu and 4.77% Kannada as their first language.

Household indicators 

In 2007–2008 the International Institute for Population Sciences interviewed 1247 households in 38 villages across the district. They found that 94% had access to electricity, 89.7% had drinking water, 34.6% toilet facilities, and 51.6% lived in a pucca (permanent) home. 30.6% of girls wed before the legal age of 18 and 85.1% of interviewees carried a BPL card.

Governance

Legislative Assembly constituencies

Courts

Road Transportation Office

Administrative divisions 
Kurnool district has three Revenue divisions viz. Kurnool, Adoni and Pattikonda. The district has 26 mandals and 53 Panchayat Samitis (Blocks) under these revenue divisions. There are 899 gram panchayats that include 7 notified and 862 non-notified, alongside 920 revenue villages and 615 hamlets. Sri P Koteswara Rao, I.A.S., is the current Collector & District Magistrate

Mandals 
The mandals are listed with respect to their revenue divisions in the following table

Kurnool district chronicle 

 During Independence, Kurnool District was without Adoni, Yemmiganur, Alur Talukas. But It had Markapuram, Giddalur, Yerragondapalem Talukas.
 Later in 1953 Andhra State was formed and Talukas of Adoni, Alur, Yemmiganur were merged with Kurnool District form Bellary District. Remaining Rayalaseema district of Bellary was merged with Karnataka.
 In 1970, new Prakasam District was formed carving out, Markapuram, Giddalur, Yerragondapalem talukas from Kurnool District. Then Kurnool district was remained with 13 Talukas.

Before Formation of Mandal System in 1985, Administration was done through Taluka system. 13 Talukas were present in Kurnool district in 1985 viz.,

These 13 were the erstwhile Talukas in Kurnool district in 1985 before the formation of mandal systems.

Cities and towns 
It also has a Municipal Corporation of Kurnool and 3 municipalities namely, Adoni, Yemmiganur, Gudur.

Kurnool District has 10 Urban Local Bodies, which are divided into 1 Municipal Corporation, 7 Municipalities, 2 Nagar Panchayats.

Economy 
The primary, secondary and tertiary sectors of the district contribute ,  and  respectively.

Transport

Roads 

NH - 44  = Srinagar to Kanyakumari. [North-South Economic Corridor]

 Total length of highway is 3,806 km. 
 250 km of this highway passes through Andhra Pradesh. 
 93 km of this Highway Passes through Kurnool District

NH - 40  = Kurnool to Ranipet. [Rayalaseema Expressway]

 Total length of highway is 408 km.
 390 km of this highway is passing in the Andhra Pradesh. 
 142 km of this highway passes through Kurnool District.

NH - 167 = Ballari to Kodad

 Total length of Highway is 483 km
 94 km of this Highway Passes through Andhra Pradesh
 94 km of this Highway Passes through Kurnool Dist.

NH - 544D = Anantapuramu to Guntur

 Total length of Highway is 417 km
 417 km of this Highway Passes through Andhra Pradesh
 118 km of this Highway Passes through Kurnool Dist.
 An alternative route to this highway is under paperwork, called Anantapuram - Amaravathi Expressway which is called as NH-544F

NH - 67 = Ramnagar to Krishnapatnam Port

 Total length of Highway is 770 km
 380 km of this Highway Passes through Andhra Pradesh
 28 km of this Highway Passes through Kurnool Dist.
NH - 340C = Kurnool to Dornala
 Total length of Highway is 132 km
 132 km of this Highway Passes through Andhra Pradesh
 100 km of this Highway Passes through Kurnool Dist.
NH - 340B = Dhone to Somayajulapalli
 Total length of Highway is 53 km
 53 km of this Highway Passes through Andhra Pradesh
 53 km of this Highway Passes through Kurnool Dist.

NH - 167K = Nandyal to Kalwakurthy
 Total length of Highway is 175 km
 86 km of this Highway Passes through Andhra Pradesh
 86 km of this Highway Passes through Kurnool Dist.

And also Some State Highways also present in Kurnool District.

Railways 
Kurnool District is served by Good Railway Connectivity.

 Hyderabad Division of South Central Railway, 
 Guntakal Division of South Coastal Railway, 
 Guntur Division of South Coastal Railway serves in Kurnool District.

Major lines passing through the district.

 Vijayawada - Hubli Railway Line
 Secunderabad - Bengaluru Railway Line
 Chennai - Mumbai Railway line Passes through the District.

Major Stations

 Dhone JN Railway station  [Guntakal Division]
 Kurnool City Railway Station  [Hyderabad Division]
 Adoni Railway Station  [Guntakal Division]
 Nandyal JN Railway Station  [Guntur Division]

Airways 
Uyyalawada Narasimha Reddy Airport [Kurnool Airport]  was opened on March 28, 2021. Commercial Flights Started to Bengaluru, Visakhapatnam, Chennai Cities.

Nearest International Airports from Kurnool

 Rajiv Gandhi International Airport, Hyderabad.  = 195 km.
 Kempegowda International Airport, Bengaluru.  = 335 km.
 Chennai International Airport, Chennai              =  450 km.
 Tirupati International Airport, Tirupati                =  330 km.

Education 

The primary and secondary school education is imparted by government, aided and private schools, under the School Education Department of the state. As per the school information report for the academic year 2015–16, there are a total of 4,179 schools. They include, 78 government, 2,398 mandal and zilla parishads, 1 residential, 1,355 private, 33 model, 53 Kasturba Gandhi Balika Vidyalaya (KGBV), 140 municipal and 121 other types of schools. The total number of students enrolled in primary, upper primary and high schools of the district are 631,740.

Tourism 

Kurnool District has many pilgrimage centers

 Srisailam
 Mantralayam
 Orvakal Rock Gardens
 City Forest [ Gargeyapuram ]
 Yaganti
 Banaganapalli Nawab Bungalow
 Belum Caves
 Kolanu Bharathi Temple
 Adoni Lakshmamma avva Temple
 Urukunda Eranna Swamy Temple
 Maddileti Swamy Temple
 Velugodu Reservoir
 Rollapadu Wildlife Sanctuary
 Nandavaram Temple
 Sanjeevaiah Sagar(Gajuladinne Project)

Sources 

Population of towns in 1941 were taken from 1991 census book from page no.132,133 and    2011 Census hand book  page no.919.

Population of every town is mentioned with proof from census books given below.

1951 census kurnool district  - http://lsi.gov.in:8081/jspui/bitstream/123456789/6419/1/50120_1951_KUR.pdf

1961 census kurnool district -  http://lsi.gov.in:8081/jspui/bitstream/123456789/2721/1/21648_1961_KUR.pdf

1971 Census kurnool district - http://lsi.gov.in:8081/jspui/bitstream/123456789/2841/1/39378_1971_KUR.pdf

1981 census kurnool district -  http://lsi.gov.in:8081/jspui/bitstream/123456789/2915/1/27365_1981_KUR.pdf

1991 census kurnool district -  http://lsi.gov.in:8081/jspui/bitstream/123456789/2935/1/39295_1991_KUR.pdf

2001 census kurnool district -  http://lsi.gov.in:8081/jspui/bitstream/123456789/2992/1/37985_2001_KUR.pdf

2011 census kurnool district -  https://censusindia.gov.in/2011census/dchb/2821_PART_A_DCHB_KURNOOL.pdf

Notable people 

 Kotla Vijaya Bhaskara Reddy, former Chief Minister of Andhra Pradesh and Central Minister
 Uyyalawada Narasimha Reddy, freedom fighter
 P. S. Ramakrishna Rao, director, writer
 Damodaram Sanjivayya, former Chief Minister of Andhra Pradesh and Central Minister

References

External links 

 

 
Districts of Andhra Pradesh
Rayalaseema